Thomas Pakenham may refer to:

Thomas Pakenham (historian) (born 1933), 8th Earl of Longford, Anglo-Irish historian and arborist
Thomas Pakenham, 1st Baron Longford (1713–1766), Irish peer and politician
Thomas Pakenham (Augher MP) (1649–1703), grandfather of the preceding
Thomas Pakenham (Royal Navy officer) (1757–1836), British naval officer and politician
Thomas Pakenham, 2nd Earl of Longford (1774–1835), Irish peer
Thomas Pakenham, 5th Earl of Longford (1864–1915), Irish peer and soldier
Thomas Pakenham (British Army officer) (1826–1913), MP for Antrim